Andrey Molchanov may refer to:

Andrey Molchanov (businessman) (born 1971),  Russian politician
Andreý Molçanow (born 1987), Olympic swimmer from Turkmenistan